Derbyshire Peak is a small rock peak 4 nautical miles (7 km) north-northeast of Mount Weihaupt in the Outback Nunataks, Victoria Land, Antarctica. The topographical feature was first mapped by the United States Geological Survey from surveys and U.S. Navy air photos, 1959–64, and was named by the Advisory Committee on Antarctic Names for Edward Derbyshire, a geologist at McMurdo Station, Hut Point Peninsula, Ross Island, 1966–67. The peak lies situated on the Pennell Coast, a portion of Antarctica lying between Cape Williams and Cape Adare.

References

Mountains of Victoria Land
Pennell Coast